Raghudebbati is a census town in Sankrail CD Block of Howrah Sadar subdivision in Howrah district in the Indian state of West Bengal. It is a part of Kolkata Urban Agglomeration.

Geography
It has an average elevation of 8 metres (26 feet).

Demographics
As per 2011 Census of India Raghudebbati had a total population of 14,165 of which 7,215 (51%) were males and 6,950 (49%) were females. Population below 6 years was 1,630. The total number of literates in Raghudebbati was 9,977 (79.59% of the population over 6 years).

Raghudebbati is part of Kolkata metropolitan Urban Agglomeration in 2011 census.

 India census, Raghudebbati had a population of 11,878. Males constitute 51% of the population and females 49%. Raghudebbati has an average literacy rate of 58%, lower than the national average of 59.5%: male literacy is 65% and female literacy is 52%. In Raghudebbati, 14% of the population is under 6 years of age.

Transport
Nalpur railway station on Howrah-Kharagpur line is the nearest railway station.

References

Cities and towns in Howrah district
Neighbourhoods in Kolkata
Kolkata Metropolitan Area